Betty Lawford (February 1, 1912 – November 20, 1960) was a United States-based English film and stage actress.

Her parents, Ernest Lawford and Janet Slater Lawford, were also actors, and she was a cousin of the actor and socialite Peter Lawford.

Lawford's stage debut came in a Players' Club production of Henry IV. She followed that with appearances in Julius Caesar and The Lady Lies. Her Broadway credits include Glamour Preferred (1940), Walk With Music (1940), The Women (1936), There's Wisdom in Women (1935), Heat Wave (1931), The Lady Lies (1928), and King Henry IV, Part I (1926).

She was briefly married to the American actor-director Monta Bell.

She died at Roosevelt Hospital, Manhattan, following an illness of three weeks.

Filmography
Gentlemen of the Press (1929)
 Lucky in Love (1929)
 The Return of Sherlock Holmes (1929)
 Old English (1930)
Secrets of a Secretary (1931)
Berkeley Square (1933)
 The Monkey's Paw (1933)
Let's Be Ritzy (1934)
 Gallant Lady (1934)
 The Human Side (1934)
Love Before Breakfast (1936)
 Criminal Lawyer (1937)
Stolen Holiday (1937)
 Stage Door Canteen (1943)
 The Devil Thumbs a Ride (1947)

References

External links
 

1910 births
1960 deaths
20th-century English actresses
Actresses from London
English emigrants to the United States
English film actresses